The Tecnam P92 Echo and Tecnam P92 Eaglet are Italian high-winged, light aircraft, designed by Luigi Pascale and built by Tecnam of Naples.

Design and development
The P92 design dates to 1960, but versions comply with the Fédération Aéronautique Internationale microlight rules and US light-sport aircraft rules. It features a strut-braced high-wing, an enclosed cabin with two seats in side-by-side configuration accessed by doors, fixed tricycle landing gear or conventional landing gear and a single engine in tractor configuration.

The aircraft is made of sheet and tubular aluminum. Standard engines available are the  Rotax 912ULS,  Rotax 914 and the  Lycoming IO-233 four-stroke powerplants.

The P92 Eaglet was introduced in 2008. It employs a cockpit section made of steel tubing covered in sheet aluminum and a monocoque tail cone.

The design is an accepted Federal Aviation Administration special light-sport aircraft.

Variants

P92-JS An upgraded version of the P92-J with  Rotax 912S. Changes include shortened wings, metal flaps, redesigned engine cowling and fairings.
P92-LY As P92 JS but with Lycoming YO-233-B2A engine instead of Rotax
P92 Echo Available with  Rotax 912UL or  Rotax 912ULS engine.

P92 Sea-Sky Amphibian version of the P92 Echo, with conventional floats equipped with retractable wheels. 
P92-S Echo Redesigned wings, engine cowling, windshield and fairing to reduce drag. Available with  Rotax 912U or  Rotax 912S.
P92 Echo Super With  Rotax 912ULS.
P92-J An upgraded version of the Echo. Available with  Rotax 912U.
P92 2000RG Fuselage redesigned, shorter wingspan, retractable landing gear. With  Rotax 912S engine.
P92-JS
P92 Eaglet  Rotax 912 engine, adds winglets to improve aerodynamic efficiency
P92 Eaglet G5 As P92 Eaglet but with free-castering nosewheel instead of steerable
P92 Eaglet G5LY As P92 Eaglet G5 but with Lycoming YO-233-B2A engine instead of Rotax.
P92-TD A conventional landing gear equipped (taildragger) compliant with the American Light Sport rules, First flown on 22 December 2011 and introduced at Sun 'n Fun 2012.
P92 Echo Light Classic Tricycle landing gear equipped version with a gross weight of

Operators

Civil
The P92 is popular with flight training schools and is also operated by private individuals and companies.

Military
Cambodian Air Force

Specifications (P92-JS)

See also

References

External links

 
 

P092
1990s Italian civil utility aircraft
Single-engined tractor aircraft
High-wing aircraft
Aircraft first flown in 1993